Dickens is an unincorporated community in Allegany County, Maryland, United States.  Three sites are listed on the National Register of Historic Places: Big Bottom Farm, Phoenix Mill Farm, and Union Grove Schoolhouse.

References

Unincorporated communities in Allegany County, Maryland
Unincorporated communities in Maryland